The Chilean Safety Association (also known as ACHS) is a Chilean private non-profit organization, focused in development of risk prevention programs, and occupational accidents coverage. With more than 2.6 million affiliated workers, more than 73,000 affiliated employment entities throughout Chile and the lowest average accident rate, ACHS is the largest mutual in Chile 

All employing entities in Chile, regardless of size, must be affiliated with a Social Security Administration agency against Risks of Occupational Accidents and Diseases under Law No. 16,744. ACHS is one of the three private administrative bodies, whose role is to develop risk prevention programs and provide health coverage and compensation associated with occupational accidents, transport and professional illnesses.

ACHS was created on November 13, 1957, after Ladislao Lira presented a project to the Directory of Sociedad de Fomento Fabril. The current president of the board of the Chilean Safety Association is Paul Schiodtz.

References

External links 
  

Medical and health organisations based in Chile
Organizations established in 1957
1957 establishments in Chile
Occupational safety and health